Julian Justvan (born 2 April 1998) is a German professional footballer who plays as a midfielder for SC Paderborn.

Career
Justvan made his professional debut for SC Paderborn in the 2. Bundesliga on 20 September 2020, coming on as a substitute in the 78th minute for Sven Michel against Holstein Kiel, with the away match finishing as a 1–0 loss.

References

External links
 
 
 
 

1998 births
Living people
German footballers
Germany youth international footballers
Association football midfielders
TSV 1860 Munich II players
VfL Wolfsburg II players
SC Paderborn 07 players
2. Bundesliga players